Round Rock is an uninhabited island in the British Virgin Islands, to the south of Virgin Gorda, east of Ginger Island and close to Fallen Jerusalem Island.

The island provides habitat for the crested anole (Anolis cristatellus wileyae), the common Puerto Rican ameiva (Ameiva exsul exsul), a type of skink (Mabuya mabouya sloanel), and the big-scaled least gecko (Sphaerodactylus macrolepis macrolepis).

References

Islands of the British Virgin Islands
Uninhabited islands of the British Virgin Islands